Seydabad (also Romanized as Şeydābād) is a village in Qomrud Rural District, in the Central District of Qom County, Qom Province, Iran. At the 2006 census, its population was 96, in 13 families.

See also

References 

Populated places in Qom Province